Karen Clarke (born 1 February 1972) is an Australian netball player. Clarke formerly played with the Queensland Firebirds during the Commonwealth Bank Trophy. Clarke also played in New Zealand's National Bank Cup in 2005, playing for the Canterbury Flames. She retired from the Firebirds after the 2007 season and has since become a firefighter with the Queensland Fire and Rescue Service.

References

1972 births
Living people
Australian netball players
Queensland Firebirds players
Commonwealth Bank Trophy players
Australian expatriate netball people in New Zealand
Australian firefighters
Netball players from Queensland
Canterbury Flames players